Skyline University is a Private owned University in Kano, Nigeria. Skyline University Nigeria was established in the year 2018, the federal government of Nigeria gave the approval to start up the private owned institution in May, 2018 in Kano. Skyline University Nigeria is the first private University in Kano, Nigeria and also the second private University in North-West region of Nigeria.

Academic Division 
From the establishment of the new institution in 2018, Skyline University Nigeria has grown into 3 different faculties with departments attached to the faculties.

There are:

School of Science and Information Technology 

 Mathematical Science
 Chemical Science
 Geology
 Biological Sciences
 Physics Sciences
 Computer Science
 Software Engineering

School of Arts, Management and Social Science 

 Mass Communication
 Management
 Economics
 Political Science
 Tourism and Hospitality Management

School of Basic Medical Sciences 

 Doctor of Physiotherapy
 B.NSc Nursing Sciences

Vice Chancellors 
The pioneer vice chancellor of Skyline University, Nigeria is Professor Sudhakar Kota, he matriculated the pioneer students of the institution, a total of 82 students in 2019, the matriculation witnessed some popular figures in Nigeria including the Emir of Kano.

In 2021, Skyline University Nigeria announces the arrival of a new vice-chancellor after the tenure of Professor Sudhakar Kota was over, the new vice-chancellor announced was Ajith Kumar Vadakki Veetil, an expatriate Doctor from the Skyline University College, He resumed office on Wednesday 27th, January 2021 to replace the former Vice-Chancellor Professor Sudhakar Kota.

References 

Universities and colleges in Nigeria
Educational institutions established in 2018